Estienne Durand (c. 1586 – 19 July 1618) was a 17th-century French poet.

A provincial controller of wars in the service of Marie de Medicis, he is the author of a pamphlet against Louis XIII, La Riparographie, now lost, which earned him to be broken and burned with his writings on the Place de Grève.

Works 
Les Épines d'Amour (1604)
Méditations (1611)
Stances à l'inconstance

References 

 Preston, VK (2015). "How do I Touch this text?: Or, the Interdisciplines Between: Dance and Theatre in Early Modern Archives", pp. 56–89, in  George-Graves, Nadine. "The Oxford Handbook of Dance and Theatre." Oxford and New York: Oxford University Press.

Bibliography 
 Frédéric Lachèvre, Estienne Durand, poète ordinaire de Marie de Médicis (1585–1618), Paris, Leclerc, 1905
 Frédéric Lachèvre, Méditations de Estienne Durand réimprimées sur l'unique exemplaire connu s. l. n. d. (vers 1611) précédées de la vie du poëte par Guillaume Colletet et d'une notice par Frédéric Lachèvre, Paris, Leclerc, 1906
 Jacques Bainville, Une histoire d'amour, Paris, Cahiers libres, 1929

External links 
 Estienne Durand on data.bnf.fr
 Estienne Durand on wikisource

17th-century French poets
17th-century French male writers
1580s births
1618 deaths